The 2023 season will be Loudoun United FC's fifth season of existence, their fifth  in the second-division of American soccer, and their fifth in the USL Championship. 

The club had originally planned to begin the season playing in MLS Next Pro, the reserve league for Major League Soccer, however due to a legal agreement for leasing Segra Field, United is required to play in the second division, requiring the club to remain in USL Championship.

On February 2, 2023, Loudoun United FC was sold to Attain Sports and Entertainment, which owns minor league baseball teams Bowie Baysox and Frederick Keys. D.C. United will continue to own a minority stake in Loudoun United. Furthermore, the change of ownership also means that Loudoun United will become eligible to participate in the 2023 U.S. Open Cup.

Background 

The 2022 season was the club's fourth season of existence, their fourth in the second-division of American soccer, and their fourth in the USL Championship. The 2022 marked an improvement in United's overall record, winning twice as many matches as last season. Despite this, the club still finished with a losing record, and failed to qualify for the playoffs for their fourth consecutive season. Notable offseason pickups included Tyler Freeman, who lead Loudoun in goals during the season. Other major pickups included Rio Hope-Gund, Carson Vom Steeg, and Skage Simonsen. During the season, several players on Loudoun were promoted to the first team including Kristian Fletcher, Sami Guediri, and Jackson Hopkins.

Transfers

Transfers in

Transfers out

Club

Roster

Staff

Non-competitive

Preseason exhibitions

Midseason exhibitions 
To be announced

Competitive

USL Championship

Standings

Results summary

Results by matchday

Match results

U.S. Open Cup

Match results

Statistics

Appearances and goals 
Numbers after plus-sign(+) denote appearances as a substitute.

|-

|-
!colspan="4"|Total
!0!!0!!0!!0!!0!!0

Top scorers 
{| class="wikitable" style="font-size: 100%; text-align: center;"
|-
! style="background:#FFFFFF; color:#FF0000; border:2px solid #FF0000; width:35px;" scope="col"|Rank
! style="background:#FFFFFF; color:#FF0000; border:2px solid #FF0000; width:35px;" scope="col"|Position
! style="background:#FFFFFF; color:#FF0000; border:2px solid #FF0000; width:35px;" scope="col"|No.
! style="background:#FFFFFF; color:#FF0000; border:2px solid #FF0000; width:160px;" scope="col"|Name
! style="background:#FFFFFF; color:#FF0000; border:2px solid #FF0000; width:75px;" scope="col"|
! style="background:#FFFFFF; color:#FF0000; border:2px solid #FF0000; width:75px;" scope="col"|
! style="background:#FFFFFF; color:#FF0000; border:2px solid #FF0000; width:75px;" scope="col"|Total
|-
|-
!colspan="4"|Total
!0!!0!!0

Top assists 
{| class="wikitable" style="font-size: 100%; text-align: center;"
|-
! style="background:#FFFFFF; color:#FF0000; border:2px solid #FF0000; width:35px;" scope="col"|Rank
! style="background:#FFFFFF; color:#FF0000; border:2px solid #FF0000; width:35px;" scope="col"|Position
! style="background:#FFFFFF; color:#FF0000; border:2px solid #FF0000; width:35px;" scope="col"|No.
! style="background:#FFFFFF; color:#FF0000; border:2px solid #FF0000; width:160px;" scope="col"|Name
! style="background:#FFFFFF; color:#FF0000; border:2px solid #FF0000; width:75px;" scope="col"|
! style="background:#FFFFFF; color:#FF0000; border:2px solid #FF0000; width:75px;" scope="col"|
! style="background:#FFFFFF; color:#FF0000; border:2px solid #FF0000; width:75px;" scope="col"|Total
|-
!colspan="4"|Total
!0!!0!!0

Disciplinary record 
{| class="wikitable" style="font-size: 100%; text-align:center;"
|-
| rowspan="2" !width=15|
| rowspan="2" !width=15|
| rowspan="2" !width=120|Player
| colspan="3"|USLC
| colspan="3"|USL Cup
| colspan="3"|Total
|-
!width=34; background:#fe9;|
!width=34; background:#fe9;|
!width=34; background:#ff8888;|
!width=34; background:#fe9;|
!width=34; background:#fe9;|
!width=34; background:#ff8888;|
!width=34; background:#fe9;|
!width=34; background:#fe9;|
!width=34; background:#ff8888;|
|-
!colspan=3|Total !!0!!0!!0!!0!!0!!0!!0!!0!!0

Clean sheets

See also 
 2023 D.C. United season

References

External links 
 Loudoun United FC

Loudoun United FC seasons
Loudoun United FC
Loudoun United FC
Loudoun United